Aliens Predator Customizable Card Game is a three-player collectible card game (CCG) that was published in 1997. It was considered one of the more successful CCGs during the late 1990s and was Harper Prism's first foray into the CCG market.

Publication history
Based on the Alien vs. Predator franchise created in the 1990s, Aliens Predator Customizable Card Game was published by Precedence Entertainment and Harper Prism. An expansion set based on Alien Resurrection was planned for early 1998.

Card art featured photographic stills from the film franchise. The 350-card set was sold in packages of three 50-card fixed starter decks (focused on Alien, Predator, and Marine players) having 10 random rare and uncommon cards, and in 15-card booster packs.

Gameplay
This is a three-player game. Each player, equipped with a game deck, takes on the role of either the Alien, the Predator or a Colonial Marine. Each role has slightly different rules which lead to different strategies. Each player plays location cards, then moves from card to card, using decoy tokens to hide real movement. When each location is searched, character and equipment cards can be played to give in-game advantages. When two players meet in the same location, combat is resolved with a six-sided die.

Reception
In the March 1998 edition of Dragon (Issue #245), Allen Varney found the game to be "exciting... easy to learn, flexible in its variety of scenarios, and fast playing." Varney concluded that it was an "endlessly replayable, adrenaline-pumping game. Bravo!"

Reviews
Backstab #8

References

External links

Alien vs. Predator (franchise) games
Card games introduced in 1997
Collectible card games based on comics